Ejnar Andersen (10 November 1911 – 24 June 1985) was a Danish footballer. He played in seven matches for the Denmark national football team from 1933 to 1937.

References

External links
 

1911 births
1985 deaths
Danish men's footballers
Denmark international footballers
Association football defenders
Boldklubben 1903 players